Sweet Embrace was a notable Australian thoroughbred racehorse. She was a chestnut daughter of Todman from the Port Vista mare Miss Port.

She was owned by Jack and Bob Ingham.

She is best remembered for winning the 1967 STC Golden Slipper Stakes as a maiden at long odds of 40/1.

The Sweet Embrace Stakes run annually at Randwick Racecourse is named in her honour.

References

Thoroughbred family 2-g
1964 racehorse births
1990 racehorse deaths
Racehorses bred in Australia
Racehorses trained in Australia